This is an incomplete list of Norwegian coats of arms. Today most municipalities and all counties have their own coats of arms. Many Norwegian military units and other public agencies and some private families have coats of arms. For more general information see the page about Norwegian heraldry.

National

Royal

Civilian agencies

Achievements including the royal arms

Other

Crowned emblems

Military

Counties and municipalities

Agder
Arms for Agder county and the municipalities (current and former) within it:

Municipalities of Agder

Former arms from Agder

Innlandet
Arms for Innlandet county and the municipalities (current and former) within it:

Municipalities of Innlandet

Former arms from Innlandet

Møre og Romsdal
Arms for Møre og Romsdal county and the municipalities (current and former) within it:

Municipalities of Møre og Romsdal

Former arms from Møre og Romsdal

Nordland
Arms for Nordland county and the municipalities (current and former) within it:

Municipalities of Nordland

Former arms from Nordland

Oslo
Arms for Oslo county:

Rogaland
Arms for Rogaland county and the municipalities (current and former) within it:

Municipalities of Rogaland

Former arms from Rogaland

Troms og Finnmark
Arms for Troms og Finnmark county  and the municipalities (current and former) within it:

Municipalities of Troms og Finnmark

Former arms from Troms and Finnmark

Trøndelag
Arms for Trondelag county and the municipalities (current and former) within it:

Municipalities of Trøndelag

Former municipalities of Trøndelag

Vestfold og Telemark
Arms for Vestfold og Telemark county and the municipalities (current and former) within it:

Municipalities of Vestfold og Telemark

Former arms from Vestfold og Telemark

Vestland
Arms for Vestland county and the municipalities (current and former) within it:

Municipalities of Vestland

Former arms from Vestland

Viken
Arms for Viken county and the municipalities (current and former) within it:

Municipalities of Viken 

Former arms from Viken

 
Norway